A Far Out Disc is a full-length album by the punk band Toy Dolls. Song "Razzmatazz Intro." was the theme tune in several series of the British TV show Razzmatazz.

Track listing
Source: Official Site

Personnel
 Michael "Olga" Algar – Vocals, Guitar
 Pete "Zulu" Robson – Bass, Vocals
 Paul "Little" Smith – Drums, Vocals

References

External links
 Full album lyrics

1985 albums
Toy Dolls albums